Melodichthys hadrocephalus is a rare species of viviparous brotula found in the northeastern Atlantic Ocean off the coast of France. This is the only known species in its genus. It is known from a single specimen.

References

Bythitidae
Monotypic fish genera
Fish described in 1986